The Action Congress Party (ACP) was a political party in Ghana during the Third Republic (1979-1981).
 
In elections held on 18 June 1979, ACP presidential candidate, Frank Bernasko, won 9.4% of the vote and the party won 10 of 140 seats in the National Assembly.

Following the coup d'état of 31 December 1981, the Provisional National Defence Council took over government and banned all political parties including the ACP.

References

1979 establishments in Ghana
1981 disestablishments in Ghana
Defunct political parties in Ghana
Political parties disestablished in 1981
Political parties established in 1979